Charles Gilbert Peterson (January 31, 1848 - October 3, 1918), was an American contractor from Lockport, New York. He was an associate in Peterson & Sons with his father, Gilbert Peterson and brother, Jesse Peterson.  The company executed such contracts as the waterworks of Toledo, Ohio and Grand Rapids, Michigan along with a reservoir in Washington, D.C. He was Mayor of Lockport in 1896 - 1897. Peterson along with Sterling H. Bunnell, held a patent on the Furnace Charging Apparatus.

On  April 27, 1881, Peterson married Jennie Zimroda Gray Lapham in Syracuse, NY.  They had three children, Rebecca Lapham Peterson, (Charles) Gilbert Peterson and Jennie Gray Peterson.  He is the grandfather of Charles Sterling Bunnell.

He was a graduate of Cornell University.

References

Mayors of places in New York (state)
1848 births
1918 deaths
Cornell University alumni
People from Mount Morris, New York
Politicians from Lockport, New York
19th-century American politicians
19th-century American businesspeople